The 14th Pan American Games were held in Santo Domingo, Dominican Republic from August 1 to August 17, 2003.

Results by event

Athletics

Track

Field

Football

Men's Competition

Group A

Swimming

Men's Competition

Women's Competition

Triathlon

See also
Paraguay at the 2004 Summer Olympics

References

Nations at the 2003 Pan American Games
Pan American Games
2003